The Provincial Council of Drenthe, also known as the States of Drenthe, is the provincial council of Drenthe, Netherlands. It forms the legislative body of the province. The Provincial Council currently holds 41 seats, which are distributed every four years in provincial elections. Due to the population of Drenthe having grown larger than 500.000 in September of 2022, the amount of seats in the Provincial Council of Drenthe is set to be expanded from 41 to 43 after the 2023 provincial elections.

Current composition
Since the 2019 provincial elections, the distribution of seats of the Provincial Council of Drenthe has been as follows:

See also
 Provincial politics in the Netherlands

References

External links
  

Politics of Drenthe
Drenthe